Lovelace: A Rock Musical is a rock musical about the life of adult film star and women's liberation advocate, Linda Lovelace.  The book, music, and lyrics are by Anna Waronker (that dog.) and Charlotte Caffey (The Go-Go's), with original concept and lyrics by Jeffery Leonard Bowman.  The show debuted with a six-month run at the Hayworth Theatre (Los Angeles) in 2008.  A new production of Lovelace: A Rock Musical made its United Kingdom debut at The Edinburgh Festival Fringe  in August 2010.

Musical numbers 

Act I
Overture
Spring of '69
Good Morning
From This Moment On
Traynor's Place
For Better Or Worse
Dashiki Interlude
Wedding Song
You Love Me
Save It For Your Prayers
Back to Business
Hide My Soul
Mrs. Boreman
Mama
Til Death Do Us Part
I'll Be Good, I'll Be Bad
Mary Had A Little Lamb
Who Could Ask For Anything More?
Gerard's Trilogy
Let's Fuck
Glamour & Glitz
Back To Business

Act II
Girl Next Door
Room Service
In Too Deep
Overnight Sensation
Best Love
Well Well Well
Best Love (Reprise)
Lovelace Interlude
So Far, So Fast
Traynor's Place (Reprise)
Who Do You Think You Are?
From this Moment On (Reprise)
I've Done Things I Would Never Do

Act III
Leaving The Limelight
Good Morning (Reprise)
Can You Feel My Love?
Take Back The Night
Ordeal
I Stand Before You
Eulogy
Out Of Bondage

Roles and cast

Edinburgh Cast
Linda Lovelace - Katrina Lenk
Chuck Traynor - Jimmy Swan
Harry Reems - Josh Greene
Mrs. Boreman - Jill Burke
Gerard Damiano - Alan Palmer
Lindsay Marchiano - Elise Vannerson
Doctor - Curt Bonnem
Young Girl - Rachael Cavenaugh
Waiter, Larry Marchiano - Joe Donohoe
Feminist - Kasi Jones

Los Angeles Cast
Linda Lovelace - Katrina Lenk
Chuck Traynor - Jimmy Swan
Harry Reems - Josh Greene
Mrs. Boreman - Whitney Allen
Gerard Damiano - Alan Palmer
Lindsay Marchiano - Sonya Bender
Doctor - Curt Bonnem
Young Girl - Kelly Devoto
Waiter, Larry Marchiano - Milan Cronovich
Feminist - Jill Burke
Stripper - Rachael Cavenaugh
Understudy - Joe Donohoe
Understudy - Kendra Smith
Understudy - Josh Adamson

Critical reception
Reception for Lovelace: A Rock Musical has been largely positive.  The Los Angeles Times chose the rock musical as a "Critics' Choice,"  and described it as a "candidate for the most original musical since Spring Awakening." Times critic David C. Nichols praised Anna Waronker and Charlotte Caffey's "accomplished score", called Ken Sawyer's direction "brilliant," and lauded Katrina Lenk's "vast emotional range" in the role of Linda Lovelace. The LA Weekly called Waronker and Caffey's musical "dark and haunting" and described Lenk's lead performance as "sensational." Backstage (West) praised the performances of Lenk, Jimmy Swan (Chuck Traynor), and Josh Greene (Harry Reems), but called the musical's story "simplistic." Frontiers (magazine) gave the musical a rating of three and a half stars.

Awards
Ovation Awards
Nomination/Best Lead Actress in a Musical (Katrina Lenk)

Back Stage Garland Awards
Win/Best Performance in a Musical Production (Katrina Lenk)
Win/Best Musical Score (Anna Waronker & Charlotte Caffey)
Nomination/Best Music Direction - Anna Waronker & Charlotte Caffey - Nomination
Nomination/Best Direction (Ken Sawyer)
Nomination/Best Performance in a (Primarily) Musical Production (Josh Greene)
Nomination/Best Performance in a (Primarily) Musical Production (Jimmy Swan)

Los Angeles Drama Critics Circle Award
Nomination/Best Musical Score (Anna Waronker & Charlotte Caffey)
Nomination/Best Direction of a Musical (Ken Sawyer)
Nomination/Best Lead Performance in a Musical (Katrina Lenk)
Nomination/Best Featured Performance in a Musical (Jimmy Swan)

LA Weekly Theatre Awards
Win/Best Director of a Musical (Ken Sawyer)
Win/Best Performance in a Musical (Katrina Lenk)
Win/Best Ensemble Cast in a Musical (Company)
Nomination/Musical of the Year

Stage Scene LA Awards
Win/Outstanding Achievement by a Director (Musical) (Ken Sawyer)
Win/Outstanding Achievement by a Lead Actor (Musical) (Jimmy Swan)
Win/Outstanding Achievement by a lead Actress (Musical) (Katrina Lenk)
Win/Best World Premier Musical (Anna Waronker & Charlotte Caffey)

References

External links 
 Lovelace: A Rock Musical - Official Site 

Rock musicals
2008 musicals
Biographical plays about actors
Plays based on real people
Plays set in the 1970s
Plays set in the 1980s
Cultural depictions of Linda Lovelace